The 2013 ATP China International Tennis Challenge – Anning was a professional tennis tournament played on clay courts. It was the second edition of the tournament which was part of the 2013 ATP Challenger Tour. It took place in Anning, China between 29 April and 5 May 2013.

Singles main draw entrants

Seeds

 1 Rankings are as of April 22, 2013.

Other entrants
The following players received wildcards into the singles main draw:
  Gao Peng
  Li Yucheng
  Wang Chuhan
  Wang Ruikai

The following players received entry from the qualifying draw:
  Chris Guccione
  Tatsuma Ito
  James Ward
  Zhao Cai

Doubles main draw entrants

Seeds

1 Rankings as of April 22, 2013.

Other entrants
The following pairs received wildcards into the doubles main draw:
  Feng Nian /  Wang Chuhan
  Gao Peng /  Gao Wan
  Tan Haiyun /  Wang Ruikai

Champions

Singles

 Márton Fucsovics def.  James Ward, 7–5, 3–6, 6–3

Doubles

 Victor Baluda /  Dino Marcan def.  Samuel Groth /  John-Patrick Smith, 6–7(5–7), 6–4, [10–7]

External links
Official Website

ATP China International Tennis Challenge
Kunming Open
2013 in Chinese tennis